HVT may refer to:
 Havertys, an American furniture retailer
 Heavyweight
 Hidden-variable theory
 High-value target
 Housing Vermont
 Tikkurila railway station, in Finland